Yarwein Mehnsonnoh (Yarwein-Mehnsohnneh) District is one of six districts located in Nimba County, Liberia. As of 2008, the population was 25,584.

References

 

Districts of Liberia
Nimba County